is a former Japanese football player. He played for Japan national team.

Club career
Oishi was born in Hiroshima on September 12, 1939. After graduating from high school, he joined Yawata Steel (later Nippon Steel). The club won 1964 Emperor's Cup. In 1965, Yawata Steel joined new league Japan Soccer League. He retired in 1970. He played 61 games and scored 21 goals in the league.

National team career
On March 3, 1964, Oishi debuted for Japan national team against Singapore.

National team statistics

References

External links
 
 Japan National Football Team Database

1939 births
Living people
Association football people from Hiroshima Prefecture
Japanese footballers
Japan international footballers
Japan Soccer League players
Nippon Steel Yawata SC players
Association football forwards